Kaluwal is a small village in Renala Khurd, Okara District, Punjab, Pakistan.

Near cities 

Renala Khurd
Okara City
Dipalpur

Near Villages
 Mittha Bhatti
 Bama Bala
 Chuchak
 Kamman
 Bazida
 K plot
 Thatti Kalasan
 Islampur
Chak 4GD
 Chak 3GD Lahori Wala
 Chak 2GD Lasian Wala
 Thatta Bhattian
 Sakhi Abdaal

Languages 
Punjabi and Urdu are basic languages of the people. Now, new generation is also well conversant with English.

Crops 
The land is very fertile and rich in production of various crops such as wheat, sugarcane, cotton, and vegetables. People often keep buffaloes, cows, sheep, goats, hens, and ducks for milk, meat and eggs.

Economics 
The fertile soil in the region surrounding the village of Kaluwal has created an economy dependent on agriculture, as it is located near a Doab (a confluence of two or more rivers). However, availability of agricultural land is limited due to the tightly packed farms of neighboring villages, which has led local people to pursue other fields such as business and government jobs.

Politics 
Zaheer Babar Chaudhary Is a Govt Chairman Of Kaluwal And Waseem Abbas Support Politically.

Sports 
Sports are a big source of entertainment, especially among local youth. Cricket is the most popular sport. The local boys' high school is used as the center of sporting activities because there are no dedicated facilities for sports events. Young students often organize sports with neighboring villages on their own initiative.

Dak khana(Post Office)
Kaluwal Address
Moza Kaluwal Dak Khana Khas Tehsil Renala Khurd District Okara Punjab Pakistan
Tehsil Renala Khurd
District Okara
Country Pakistan
Postal Code 56131

References 

Villages in Okara District